The Voice Nigeria is the Nigerian franchise of the TV series The Voice. It is a singing competition that features music enthusiasts and professional performers. Since its first edition in 2016 in Nigeria, the show has become the biggest rival to the Nigerian Idol. It has also produced many talents and celebrated artistes in the country and Africa at large.

Blinds 
This is the beginning of where coaches would have to build their team which should consist of 6 talents.

As the name implies, at this stage, the coaches’ chairs are turned towards the audience while the talent perform,if any of the coaches finds interest in the talent, he/she would have to hit the buzzer (red button) while their chair turns to face the talents. If there is more than one interested coach, the talent will have to select whose team he/she would want to belong, after all interested coaches pitch for the talent.

Live shows 
After the battle rounds comes the Live Shows. In this stage, each of the talents perform a song given by their coach, and the coach saves one out of every four talents while the rest are left to public votes. Public votes save one talent out of each team every week while the rest are evicted.
The talents are cut from 32 to 16 to 12 to 8 of them who qualify for the finals. From the top 8, the winner and runner up are decided by the public votes.

Coaches and presenters

Coaches timeline

Presenters timeline 

Key
 Main host
 Backstage

Series overview 

  Team Waje
  Team 2Baba
  Team Patoranking
  Team Timi Dakolo
  Team Yemi Alade
  Team Falz
  Team Darey
  Team Naeto C
  Team Praiz
  Team Niyola

Season 1 (2016) 

The opening broadcast was on 10 April 2016. The four coaches for the inaugural season are Nigerian artistes Waje, Timi Dakolo, Patoranking and 2baba aka Tuface (formerly known as 2face Idibia). The programme is hosted by IK Osakioduwa and Stephanie Coker.

Season 2 (2017) 

The Voice Nigeria had four coaches like the first season and featured Yemi Alade (a new coach) in place of 2face Idibia. It was also hosted by Ik Osakioduwa and Stephanie Coker. The winner of the edition was Idyl.

Teams

Blind Auditions

Battles 
The battles began on 30 July 2017. The coaches can steal 2 losing artists from other coaches and proceed to live shows. At the end of battles, only 8 artists will remain on each team, 6 will be from battles that were won , and 2 from steals. A total of  32 advancing to live shows and 17 eliminated.

Live Shows 
The Live Shows began on 27 August 2017. All the 32 artists who advanced from the battles performed in the live shows for a place in the semifinals. This was divided in two episodes where 4 artists per team would perform in each episode. Two artists per team advanced from each episode, one as coaches' vote and the other from public votes. A total of 8 artists advanced to the semifinals. All the 8 artists performed in the semifinal rounds for the public votes. Only 4 artists went through to the live finals. Idyl from team Timi was announced as the winner of the second series of the voice Nigeria.and Ebube from team Patoranking as runner-up.

Season 3 (2021) 
After 3 years away, The Voice Nigeria is back with Season Three. Organisers have announced that the singing competition is open for online auditions - *25 August – 19 September 2020* and is expected to attract and help Nigerian musical talents.
The Coaches for the Season 3 includes first-time coaches Darey, and Falz, as well as return coaches, Waje, and Yemi Alade. The programme will be hosted by Nancy Isime, co-hosted by Toke Makinwa during the blind auditions and Stephanie Coker hosting the Red Room from the Live Shows. The show promises to take an interesting twist this season with many virtual engagements with fans, talents and the general public The winner of this edition is Esther Benyeogo

Teams

Blind Auditions

Knockouts 
Knockouts began on 9 May 2021. 6 artists per team compete against each other for a spot in the battle rounds. One can either advance to the battles by a safe from their coach or steal from another coach.

Battles 
The Battles began on 5 June 2021 and concluded on 12 June 2021. In this round, each coach pairs 2 artists against each other to battle out. At the end of the battle, a coach chooses one artist in each battle to advance to the live shows. Later, the public then chooses one of the losing artists per team to advance.

Live Shows 
The live shows started on 3 July 2021. A total of 12 artists performed in front of the coaches and a live audience for a spot in the next round. Only 2 artists per team advanced, one from judge's choice and the other from public votes. On the 2nd week of live shows, all 8 who advanced performed for a spot in the semifinals. A total of 6 from the top vote getters from the public advanced. During the 3rd week of live shows, the top 6 performed for a chance to be crowned the winner of the  voice season 3.

Finale 
The finale aired on 24 July from 8.30pm. The artists performed duets in the 1st round after which the top 4 were revealed. The top 4 performed solo performances thereafter and the winner of the voice was crowned at the end of the show.

Awards and nominations

References

External links 
The Voice Nigeria Website

Nigeria
Nigerian reality television series
2016 Nigerian television series debuts
2010s Nigerian television series
Music competitions in Nigeria
Africa Magic original programming